Pseudomonas guryensis is a Gram-negative, aerobic and rod-shaped bacterium from the genus of Pseudomonas which has been isolated from soil.

References

Pseudomonadales
Bacteria described in 2013